Supply Act is a stock short title used for legislation in a number of countries and may refer to:

 Supply Act (Singapore)
 Supply Act (Australia)
 Supply Act (Ontario, Canada)